The 1974 Women's BP Open Squash Championships was held at the BP Club in Lower Sydenham, London from 1–7 March 1974. Heather McKay (née Blundell) won her thirteenth consecutive title defeating Sue Cogswell in the final.

Seeds

Draw and results

First round

Fourth seed Mavis Nancarrow (Aus) withdrew from the tournament.

Second round

Third round

Quarter-finals

Semi-finals

Third-place play-off

Final

References

Women's British Open Squash Championships
Sydenham, London
British Open Squash Championship
Women's British Open Squash Championship
Squash competitions in London
Women's British Open Championship
British Open Championship
Women's British Open Squash Championship